Ibri Airport  is an airport serving the town of Ibri in Oman.

See also
Transport in Oman
List of airports in Oman

References

External links
OpenStreetMap - Ibri

Landings - Ibri Airport

Airports in Oman
Ad Dhahirah North Governorate